Victor Mosele was a Catholic Xaverian missionary priest.  He spent 30 years in Sierra Leone building schools, clinics, and promoting his religion.  At one point, he was in charge of 33 different schools, including 6,000 children.

According to a Xaverian Missionary Newsletter of 1999, Mosele was captured by the rebel army in Kambia near Guinea on February 11, 1999.  He had turned back in an effort to acquire medicine for the wounded when he was met by the RUF rebels and taken to Makeni.

On September 6 he was captured again along with Fr. Franco Manganello at Pamelap near the border of Guinea.  In one of Mosele's accounts of his experiences in Sierra Leone, he recalls that the people who captured him had been part of the schools he established.  On October 4, 2000 Pope John Paul II made an appeal at his general audience to the rebel army for peace and for the release of Victor Mosele and Franco Manganello.

From 2009
Mosele was at the campus ministry center,  in Madison, WI, and was then stationed at Illinois State University's St. Robert Bellarmine Catholic Center during the 2009–10 school year. He wrote a book about his experiences titled Running For My Life, which was published in Fall 2006. He died on August 23, 2012 and was buried on August 28, 2012.

References
Story of Survival
Campus Ministry

Pope John Paul II General Audience Wednesday October 4, 2000
Homily and Personal Account of Victor Mosele regarding Sierra Leone
Sierra Leone News Archives

Living people
American Roman Catholic priests
Roman Catholic missionaries in Sierra Leone
American Roman Catholic missionaries
Missionary educators
American expatriates in Sierra Leone
Year of birth missing (living people)